Eutaw may refer to:
Eutaw, Alabama, a town, United States
Eutaw massacre, a racially motivated massacre in that town
Eutaw, Mississippi, a ghost town, United States
Eutaw Street, a major street in Baltimore, Maryland
Eutaw Formation, a geological formation in the U.S. states of Alabama, Georgia, and Mississippi
USS Eutaw (1863), a Union Navy steam gunboat of the American Civil War
Eutaw, an album by Old Crow Medicine Show
A section of Fayetteville, North Carolina, just off of Bragg Boulevard

See also
Battle of Eutaw Springs, part of the American Revolutionary War